Abraham Fowler (fl. 1577) was an English poet.

Fowler was a queen's scholar at Westminster, whence he was elected to Christ Church, Oxford, in 1568. His name does not appear on the university register. He contributed a poem in alternate rhymes to A Philosophicall discussion entituled The Anatomie of the Minde by Thomas Rogers, London, 1576. Rogers was a student of Christ Church. Fowler's verse is followed by a poem by William Camden.

References

Attribution

Year of birth missing
Year of death missing
16th-century English poets
Alumni of Christ Church, Oxford
English male poets